John McGlashan may refer to:

 John McGlashan (politician) (1802–1864), New Zealand lawyer, politician and educationalist
 John McGlashan College, boarding school for boys in Dunedin, New Zealand, named for the above
 John McGlashan (footballer) (1967–2018), Scottish football player and manager 
 John Glashan (born John McGlashan, 1927–1999), Scottish cartoonist, illustrator and playwright